Saad Al-Bishi (born 13 January 1953) is a Saudi Arabian athlete. He competed in the men's shot put at the 1976 Summer Olympics.

References

1953 births
Living people
Athletes (track and field) at the 1976 Summer Olympics
Saudi Arabian male shot putters
Olympic athletes of Saudi Arabia
Place of birth missing (living people)